"Cops and Robbers" is a single by English pop rock band the Hoosiers. It was their fourth single to be released from their debut album, The Trick to Life. It was first made available to download through the album which was released on 22 October 2007. The single was physically released on 21 April 2008 as confirmed by the band on tour. The song has been noted for its remarkable similarities to "The Lovecats" by the Cure.

Chart performance
In the UK, the single performed better than its predecessor, "Worst Case Scenario", although it did not match the success of "Worried About Ray" or "Goodbye Mr A". It debuted at number 64 on the UK Singles Chart via download sales alone before eventually peaking at number 24 two weeks later. It had a run of 10 weeks in the UK top 100.

Music video
The first showing of the video was on Channel 4 on 22 March 2008. The video was shot at Dickens World, directed by the directing duo Diamond Dogs (aka Phil Sansom and Olly Williams) and is set in London in the 1800s.

Track listing
UK and European CD single
 "Cops and Robbers"
 "Goodbye Mr A" (live from Shepherd's Bush Empire)

Charts

References

2007 songs
2008 singles
The Hoosiers songs
RCA Records singles
Songs about police officers